Institute for Cancer Research can refer to a number of separate organizations:

 Institute of Cancer Research, located in London, United Kingdom
 Institute of Cancer of São Paulo
 American Institute for Cancer Research, located in Washington, DC
 Institute for Cancer Research, founded in 1927 and now known as Lankenau Institute for Medical Research
 Fox Chase Cancer Center, formed by the merger of the Institute for Cancer Research and the American Oncologic Hospital